Raúl Benito Toro Basáez (born 19 July 1965) is a former Chilean footballer who played as a forward for clubs in Chile and El Salvador.

Club career
A product of both Unión Española and Santiago Morning youth systems, he made his professional debut with Universidad de Chile thanks of the coach Hernán Carrasco. In Chile Toro also played for Unión Española, Santiago Morning and Deportes Arica. Along with Universidad de Chile, he took part in the 1989 season, where the club was relegated to the Segunda División.

In 1989, Toro moved to El Salvador and joined Alianza, winning the 1989–90 Primera División. Then he moved to Luis Ángel Firpo and won 6 titles until 2000, becoming one of the Chilean football players who have won more league titles in his career.

International career
Following his debut with Universidad de Chile, Toro represented Chile at youth level in a tour for Singapore, France, Italy and Indonesia. At under-20 level, he represented Chile in the 1985 South American Championship in Paraguay.

Personal life
After working as football manager and being honored with two farewell matches in El Salvador, he returned to his country of birth permanently in 2014.

Honours
Alianza
Primera División (1): 1989–90

Luis Ángel Firpo   
Primera División (6): 1990–91, 1991–92, 1992–93, 1997–98, 1999 Clausura, 2000 Clausura

References

External links
 
 Raúl Toro at PlaymakerStats

1965 births
Living people
Footballers from Santiago
Chilean footballers
Chilean expatriate footballers
Chile youth international footballers
Chile under-20 international footballers
Association football forwards
Universidad de Chile footballers
Unión Española footballers
Santiago Morning footballers
San Marcos de Arica footballers
Alianza F.C. footballers
C.D. Luis Ángel Firpo footballers
C.D. Atlético Marte footballers 
Chilean Primera División players
Tercera División de Chile players
Primera B de Chile players
Salvadoran Primera División players
Chilean football managers
Chilean expatriate football managers
Chilean expatriate sportspeople in El Salvador
Expatriate footballers in El Salvador
Expatriate football managers in El Salvador